The 1935 Missouri Tigers football team was an American football team that represented the University of Missouri in the Big Six Conference (Big 6) during the 1935 college football season. The team compiled a 3–3–3 record (0–2–3 against Big 6 opponents), finished in sixth place in the Big 6, and outscored all opponents by a total of 97 to 77.  

Don Faurot, previously the head football coach at Kirksville Teachers College, was hired as Missouri's head coach in January 1935. He remained as Missouri's head coach for the first of 19 seasons.

The team played its home games at Memorial Stadiu in Columbia, Missouri.

The team's leading scorers were Al Londe and Henry Mahley, each with 18 points.

Schedule

References

Missouri
Missouri Tigers football seasons
Missouri Tigers football